Amara littoralis is a species of beetle of the genus Amara in the family Carabidae. It is native to parts of Asia.

References
Notes

Citations

littoralis
Beetles of Asia
Beetles described in 1828
Taxa named by Pierre François Marie Auguste Dejean